Gahnia baniensis is a tussock-forming perennial in the family Cyperaceae, that is native to parts of Asia.

References

baniensis
Plants described in 1938
Flora of Borneo
Flora of China
Flora of Malaysia
Flora of Indonesia
Flora of Vietnam